Taram may refer to:
Taram language, of Nigeria
Taram, Iran (disambiguation), places in Iran
Taram, West Sumatra, a village

See also